Talybolion was a commote in the Hundred of Cemaes. The parishes of Llanfwrog and Llanbadrig were within its boundaries.

References

History of Anglesey
Commotes of Gwynedd